Bokermannohyla claresignata is a species of frog in the family Hylidae.
It is endemic to Serra do Mar, Brazil.
Its natural habitats are subtropical or tropical moist lowland forests, subtropical or tropical moist montane forests, and rivers.
It is threatened by habitat loss but is protected by Parque da Serra dos Orgãos, and Parque Nacional da Serra Bocaina.

Sources
 

Bokermannohyla
Endemic fauna of Brazil
Amphibians described in 1939
Taxonomy articles created by Polbot
Taxobox binomials not recognized by IUCN